Tobias Müller (born 29 June 1989) is a German darts player currently playing in Professional Darts Corporation events.

Müller qualified for his first PDC European Tour events in 2018, but only won one leg in each game, being defeated by Maik Kuivenhoven and Stephen Bunting.

References

External links

Living people
German darts players
Professional Darts Corporation associate players
1989 births
Sportspeople from Heilbronn
21st-century German people